Farrer Park is a place name in Singapore. Specifically, the name Farrer Park may refer to:

Farrer Park, a subzone of Rochor planning area as established by the Urban Redevelopment Authority to facilitate urban planning
Farrer Park Field, a sports field located within Kallang planning area
Farrer Park MRT station, a Mass Rapid Transit (MRT) station on the North East Line located on the boundary of Kallang and Rochor planning areas
Farrer Park Hospital, a privately owned hospital located at 1 Farrer Park Station Road in Rochor planning area